The Frank C. Erwin Jr. Center (commonly known as Frank Erwin Center or UT Erwin Center and originally Special Events Center) is  an inactive multi-purpose arena located on the campus of the University of Texas at Austin in Austin, Texas. It is also sometimes referred to as "The Drum" or "The Superdrum", owing to its round, drum-like appearance from outside (not to be confused with Big Bertha, the large bass drum used by the University of Texas marching band).

The multi-purpose facility hosted entertainment events and was the home court for the Texas Longhorns men's and women's basketball programs until 2022, when it was replaced by the Moody Center. The Erwin Center is located at the southeastern corner of the UT central campus and is bounded on the east by Interstate 35.

History

Built to replace Gregory Gymnasium as the men's and women's basketball teams' home arena, the Special Events Center was completed in 1977 for a total cost of $34 million. The Texas men's basketball team opened the events center on November 29, 1977, with an 83–76 victory over the Oklahoma Sooners. UT undertook extensive renovations of the facility from 2001 to 2003 at a cost of $55 million, adding, among other things, new and renovated seating, new video and sound systems, new lighting, and 28 suites.

The building is named for former UT Board of Regents member Frank Erwin, who as a regent was very controversial due to his hostility towards the burgeoning on-campus, political counterculture movement of the late 1960s and was directly involved in the arrest of protesting students and the purging of what he deemed as "unpatriotic" faculty. Originally known as the Special Events Center, the facility was renamed in 1980 to honor Erwin, who died that same year.

A two-level layout (the lower arena and upper mezzanine) accommodates up to 16,540 spectators for basketball games and up to 17,900 spectators for concerts. The inner ring of the arena averages around 20 rows deep, while the mezzanine is slightly deeper at around 24 rows. The size of the arena's inner ring is highly dependent on the event being hosted.

Replacement 
The Dell Medical Center, a $334 million teaching hospital for the university, has identified the parking lot and Waller Creek area directly across from the Frank Erwin Center as Phase I of construction, with later phases calling for the demolition of the Frank Erwin Center.

In 2018, it was announced that Oak View Group and the University of Texas had agreed to build a new $338 million arena for the Texas Longhorns basketball programs to replace the Frank Erwin Center. The new arena is named the Moody Center after the Moody Foundation, who donated $130 million to Texas Athletics. A groundbreaking ceremony took place just south of Mike A. Myers Soccer Stadium on December 3, 2019, and completed in 2022. Moody Center opened on April 20, 2022, with plans to close the Frank Erwin Center in May 2022. UT's final graduation ceremonies at the Erwin Center took place on May 20–21, 2022 and was the last scheduled event to be held there.

Events
Located adjacent to downtown Austin, The Erwin Center is generally accepted to be Austin's current premier venue for large public and private events. The center holds many events such as concerts, professional wrestling events, bull riding and private banquets.

The arena has hosted three UFC mixed martial events: UFC Fight Night: Marquardt vs. Palhares in 2010, UFC Fight Night: Edgar vs. Swanson in 2014, and UFC Fight Night: Cowboy vs. Medeiros in 2018.

Music artists such as Taylor Swift, David Bowie, Tina Turner, Lana Del Rey, Ariana Grande, KISS, U2, Bon Jovi, Pearl Jam, Paul McCartney, Def Leppard, George Strait, Garth Brooks, Van Halen, Rush, AC/DC, Pink Floyd, 
Prince, Guns N' Roses, Rod Stewart, Madonna, Whitney Houston, Radiohead, Kanye West, Lady Gaga, Miley Cyrus and many others have performed at the arena.

The Erwin Center hosted the semifinals and finals of the University Interscholastic League boys' and girls' basketball playoffs in all five classifications until 2015, when the playoffs moved to San Antonio.

The arena also hosts both UT commencement ceremonies and various local high school graduations.

Basketball attendance record

See also
 List of NCAA Division I basketball arenas

References

External links

Frank Erwin Center 
Frank C. Erwin Jr., Special Events Center – Texassports.com 

Defunct basketball venues in the United States
Defunct college basketball venues in the United States
Defunct indoor arenas in Texas
Defunct sports venues in Texas
Basketball venues in Texas
Mixed martial arts venues in Texas
Texas Longhorns basketball venues
Event venues established in 1977
University of Texas at Austin campus
1977 establishments in Texas